Reza Rooygari (also Romanized as "Rezā Rūygarī"; born December 27, 1946, in Shemiran, Tehran, Iran) is an Iranian singer, painter, television, theater and cinema actor. He is known for his role in Iranian famous series such as Mokhtarnameh, Eagles and The Tenants.

Filmography

Cinema
Coin
Be Vaghte Talagh
Dookhtaran Ham Mimirand
The Lodgers
Eagles

TV
Rich and Poor
Mokhtarnameh
Yek Santimetr Ta Labkhand
Loneliness of Leila
King of Ear

References

External links

 

1946 births
Living people
People from Tehran
Singers from Tehran
Iranian male singers
Male actors from Tehran
Iranian male film actors
Iranian male stage actors
Iranian male television actors